Kujikata Osadamegaki (公事方御定書, "book of rules for public officials") was a two-volume rulebook for Japanese judicial bureaucrats during the Edo period (江戸時代). It was enacted by Shōgun Tokugawa Yoshimune in 1742.

The book was used to determine appropriate judgements and punishments by servants of the daimyō (大名), but these servants were not required to follow the guidelines of the Kujikata Osadamegaki. Rather, they were bound to mete out fair justice only by the Japanese Confucian directive to serve one's daimyō well.

References
Yosiyuki Noda (1976). Introduction to Japanese Law, trans. and ed. by Anthony H. Angelo. Tokyo: University of Tokyo Press, 1976: 31–39.

Legal history of Japan
1742 in law